Captain Bashir Aldukhun Belal (born 1 June 1994), known as just Captain Bashir, is a Sudanese professional footballer who plays as a defensive midfielder for the Sudanese club  Al-Merrikh SC, and the Sudan national team.

International career
Bashir made his international debut with the Sudan national team in a 0–0 friendly tie with Zimbabwe on 2 January 2022. He was part of the Sudan squad that was called up for the 2021 Africa Cup of Nations.

References

External links
 
 

1994 births
Living people
Sudanese footballers
Sudan international footballers
Association football midfielders
Al-Hilal Club (Omdurman) players
Sudan Premier League players
2021 Africa Cup of Nations players